The Survivors is a live album by country/rockabilly musicians Johnny Cash, Carl Perkins, and Jerry Lee Lewis, released in 1982 on Columbia Records.

Contents
The album was recorded live on stage on April 23, 1981, in Böblingen, near Stuttgart, West Germany, when all three singers, who had been labelmates at Sun Records at the beginning of their careers, were touring Europe. The show had initially been meant to feature only Cash, but Lewis and Perkins joined him onstage on a night when they did not have a concert scheduled themselves.  Without rehearsal, the three performed a number of songs they were known for - including Cash's "Get Rhythm" and Perkins' "Blue Suede Shoes" - as well as slightly more obscure compositions. Perkins, Cash and Lewis had previously collaborated with each other, and with Elvis Presley (who had died in 1977), during the Million Dollar Quartet session, and would later collaborate for the album Class of '55 with Roy Orbison in 1985. For the last song on the album, "I Saw the Light", Cash, Perkins and Lewis were joined by Cash's son John Carter and his daughter Cindy Cash.

Track listing

Personnel

 Johnny Cash - Vocals, Guitar, Arranger, Liner Notes
 Jerry Lee Lewis - Vocals, Piano
 Carl Perkins - Vocals, Guitar
 Jerry Hensley, Kenneth Lovelace, Bob Wootton - Electric Guitar
 Marty Stuart - Guitar, Mandolin
 Earl Ball - Piano
 Jack Hale Jr., Bob Lewin - Trumpet, French Horn
 W.S. Holland - Drums
Henry Strzelecki - Bass

Additional personnel

 Lou Robin - Executive producer
 Rodney Crowell - Producer, Mixing
 Bradley Hartman, Ron Treat - Mixing
 Steve Hoffman - Mastering
 Bill Johnson - Art director
 Kevin Gray - CD preparation
 Murray Brenman - Reissue design

Charts
Album - Billboard (United States)

References 

Jerry Lee Lewis albums
Carl Perkins albums
1982 live albums
Johnny Cash live albums
Columbia Records live albums